Thomas Jefferson is a 1911 bronze statue of a seated Thomas Jefferson created by Karl Bitter for the Cuyahoga County Courthouse in Cleveland, Ohio, United States.

A 1913 marble version, approximately 50 percent larger than the Cleveland statue, is installed at the Missouri History Museum in St. Louis. 
Bronze replicas of the Cleveland statue were installed at the University of Virginia in Charlottesville in 1915, and at Jefferson High School in Portland, Oregon in 1916. A plaster replica was donated to Thomas Jefferson High School in Brooklyn, New York City in 1929.

Cuyahoga County Courthouse, Cleveland
In 1909, Bitter was commissioned to create a bronze statue of a seated Thomas Jefferson and a bronze statue of a seated Alexander Hamilton, to flank the entrance steps to the Cuyahoga County Courthouse in Cleveland, Ohio. Both works were cast by the Roman Bronze Works, and installed in 1911.

Jefferson is depicted wearing 18th-century clothes, sitting in a klismos chair and holding "papers of state in hand." According to Ferdinand Schevill, "It is a youthful and rebellious Jefferson, author of the Declaration of Independence who appears before us in Cleveland." James Dennis describes the statue as having a "generally rustic appearance" in contrast to the nearby Hamilton whom he sees as an "aggressive young aristocrat."

Bitter also created two marble attic figures for the courthouse, John Somers and Lord Mansfield.

Replicas

Missouri History Museum, St. Louis

Bitter served as director of sculpture for the Louisiana Purchase Exposition, the 1904 World's Fair held in St. Louis to celebrate the centenary of the Louisiana Purchase. John Quincy Adams Ward was commissioned to create a heroic-size seated figure of Thomas Jefferson for the Exposition, but the commission went to Charles Grafly following Ward's withdrawal. Grafly's Seated Jefferson was modeled in staff, a temporary building material, and does not survive.

In 1909, the Exposition's executive committee realized that the World's Fair had actually generated a profit. Instead of attempting to divide the profit among the Exposition's 15,000 stockholders, the committee decided to build a Jefferson Memorial in St. Louis. President Jefferson had played the central role in the 1803 Louisiana Purchase, and there was not yet a national monument to him in Washington, D.C. Architects were hired and, after the usual issues surrounding attempting to design by committee were resolved, Isaac S. Taylor designed the Jefferson Memorial Building.

The centerpiece of the memorial was to be a monumental statue of Jefferson. Bitter had already modeled his seated Jefferson for Cleveland, and the committee commissioned him to create a marble version 50 percent larger than the original. The Cleveland statue depicted a 33-year-old Jefferson, his age at the time of the writing of the Declaration of Independence. The St. Louis statue was to depict a 60-year-old President of the United States, his age at the time of the Louisiana Purchase. The statue was roughed out of a forty-five ton block of white marble in Italy, and shipped to St. Louis, where Bitter did the finished carving in situ. The completed statue was unveiled on April 13, 1913, Jefferson's 170th birthday.

Bitter's one-quarter-size plaster model is in the collection of the St. Louis Art Museum.

University of Virginia, Charlottesville

Shortly after the unveiling of the St. Louis statue, Bitter received a commission from Charles R. Crane and Edwin Alderman to create a replica of the Jefferson statue for the University of Virginia, a school to which Jefferson had strong ties.  For this work Bitter slightly modified the previous statue, changing the position of the right arm slightly and aging Jefferson once again. This version was cast in bronze by the Roman Bronze Works, and dedicated on April 13, 1915, Jefferson's 172nd birthday and days after Bitter's death in a car accident.

Jefferson High School, Portland, Oregon

Another casting of the statue was located outside Jefferson High School in north Portland, Oregon. The statue, which overlooks the football and track fields on the north side of the school, depicts Jefferson seated on a draped chair with his arm resting on its back. His right arm rests in his lap and holds a pen and papers. The bronze measures  x  x  and sits on a stone base that measures  x  x .

One inscription displays:  The front of the plinth reads: . The base's west side displays: . The east side of the base includes inscriptions of the foundry Roman Bronze Works' mark as well as the text: .

Jefferson High School graduates suggested installing a statue of the president on the campus in June 1913. The statue was dedicated in May 1916, having been funded by alumni, current students, and members of School District Number One's board of directors, who pledged to match the students' donation. In all $2,400 was raised for the work. It was surveyed and considered "treatment needed" by the Smithsonian Institution's "Save Outdoor Sculpture!" program in December 1993. On June 14, 2020, the statue was pushed onto the ground during one of the George Floyd protests.

Thomas Jefferson High School, Brooklyn
In 1929, Bitter's widow and the Thomas Jefferson Memorial Foundation donated a plaster cast of the sculpture to Thomas Jefferson High School in Brooklyn.

See also

 1911 in art
 List of monuments and memorials removed during the George Floyd protests
 List of sculptures of presidents of the United States
 List of statues of Thomas Jefferson

References

Sources

 
 
 
 

1911 establishments in Ohio
1911 sculptures
1913 establishments in Missouri
1913 sculptures
1915 establishments in Virginia
1915 sculptures
1916 establishments in Oregon
1916 sculptures
1929 establishments in New York City
1929 sculptures
Bronze sculptures in Ohio
Bronze sculptures in Oregon
Bronze sculptures in Virginia
Buildings and structures in Brooklyn
Buildings and structures in Charlottesville, Virginia
Buildings and structures in Cleveland
Buildings and structures in St. Louis
Humboldt, Portland, Oregon
Marble sculptures in the United States
Monuments and memorials in Missouri
Monuments and memorials in New York City
Monuments and memorials in Ohio
Monuments and memorials in Portland, Oregon
Monuments and memorials in Virginia
Monuments and memorials removed during the George Floyd protests
North Portland, Oregon
Outdoor sculptures in Ohio
Outdoor sculptures in Portland, Oregon
Plaster sculptures in the United States
Sculptures by Karl Bitter
Sculptures of men in Missouri
Sculptures of men in New York City
Sculptures of men in Ohio
Sculptures of men in Oregon
Sculptures of men in Virginia
Statues in Missouri
Statues in New York City
Statues in Ohio
Statues in Portland, Oregon
Statues in Virginia
Statues of Thomas Jefferson
University of Virginia
Vandalized works of art in Oregon